Warooka is a town on the Yorke Peninsula in South Australia, known as the 'Gateway to the bottom end'.

See also
 List of cities and towns in South Australia

References

External links

Towns in South Australia